The Selaulim Dam is located on the Selaulim River, a tributary of the Zuari River in Goa, India, is an integral component of the Selaulim Irrigation Project which envisages benefits of irrigation and drinking water supply.

The initial cost of the project, when approved in 1971, was Rs. 9.61 crore, which, as of 2007, is estimated to cost Rs. 170 crores. However, the construction of the project was started in 1976 and the dam was completed in 2000, and the irrigation component is under final stages of completion having achieved an irrigation potential of 9,537 ha, as of 2007.

Geography
The project is located at Sirga about 5 km from the Sanguem town, in the Zuari River Basin,  which is drained by the Zuari River which in turn is formed after the confluence of Selaulim (also spelled Selaulim) and Uguem Rivers in Sanguem taluk. The Selauilm dam is located on the Selaulim River (also known as Sanguem) near the Sanguem town.

Project features

The dam is a composite structure of earth-cum-masonry type of  height above the deepest foundation level. The dam structure has a volume content of 2.714 million cubic metres (MCM). The gross storage capacity of the reservoir is 234.361 MCM with the live or effective storage capacity  fixed at 227.157 MCM. Out the total live storage of about 227 MCM, 126 MCM is for irrigation and the balance 101 MCM is earmarked for domestic and industrial water use. As a result, 220 MLD of water is available for industrial and domestic use in South Goa, in addition to 160 MLD originally provided in the approved project.

Submergence

The reservoir submergence involved 20 villages which were partially or fully submerged. 3000 people were displaced and resettled. Mining areas were also submerged for which compensation was provided. The relocation was done by dismantling of the original temple and then reassembling it at the new location after methodically numbering each stone, over a period of 11 years.

Seismicity
Following an earthquake in the project area (which lasted for 5 seconds and had no effect on the safety of the dam), a proposal has been mooted to install a seismograph near Selaulim dam (location  from the Sanguem town) to monitor any Tectonics activity in the area.

Irrigation system
The irrigation system of the project was planned to irrigate lands in Sanguem, Quepum and Salceto taluks (to grow sugar cane to meet the needs of Goa's first sugar mill). As originally planned, the main canal had distributary canals D1, D2-D3 (combined off taking from the main canal at chainage ), minor canals M1, M2 and M3, which are all completed. The water thus saved is proposed to be used for increasing the water supply for domestic and industrial users by about 220 MLD. As a part of the command area development, 28 Water Users Associations (WUAs) have been instituted and out of these, 15 WUAs have been given control over the water distribution networks.

Other benefits
In the vicinity of the Selaulim dam area, proposals were mooted to set up a health centre with a modern hospital with 300 beds, along with a nature park and a botanical garden. The Botanical Garden was planned by the Goa Forest Department, patterned on the Brindavan Gardens in Mysore, involving landscaping and ornamental plantation.

Fish is an important factor in the life of Goans and in this context the reservoir area of Selaulim and Anjunem Irrigation projects have also provided livelihood opportunities for the fishing community. Fish seed farming was started in the fresh water lake of Selaulim for fish production.

Pollution
Mining operations are still done in three mines, which are located within 1 km from the reservoir periphery. A panel of experts has advised the authorities concerned to take adequate steps to prevent pollution of lake waters by mining effluents, as the reservoir is a source of drinking water supply.

References

External links

Water overflowing the spillway at Selaulim Dam in Sanguem.
The 'duckbill spillway' at Selaulim dam, Goa

Dams in Goa
Masonry dams
Dams completed in 2000
Buildings and structures in South Goa district
2000 establishments in Goa